Kobayashi (小林, 古林) is a Japanese surname.

Kobayashi may also refer to:

Places
Kobayashi, Miyazaki, a city in Japan
Kobayashi Station (disambiguation), multiple railway stations in Japan

Fictional locations
Kobayashi, a planet in the Yakawa system of Mass Effect 2

Other uses
"Kobayashi", a 2022 episode of Star Trek: Prodigy
Kobayashi, a jazz-meets-funk-meets-hip hop-meets-electronica band from Montreal.
Kobayashi, a character in the 1995 film The Usual Suspects, played by Pete Postlethwaite

See also

 
 Kobayashi Electronics, a corporation in the film Cyborg 2
Kobayashi Maru (disambiguation), including ships named 'Kobayashi' suffixed "maru"
"Kobayashi Maru", the fictional test in Star Trek